Patrick Richard Harverson LVO is a public relations executive and former journalist. Since 2013, he has been a managing partner of Milltown Partners LLP. He was previously the Communications Secretary to then The Prince of Wales and The Duchess of Cornwall, in addition to being Official Spokesman to then The Duke and Duchess of Cambridge.

Early life
Patrick Harverson was born in 1962, and educated at Belmont Abbey, Hereford, Brockenhurst College, Hampshire, and the London School of Economics.

Journalism
Harverson worked for the Financial Times newspaper from 1988 to 2000. Roles covered included stock market reporter 1988–1989, economics staff writer 1989–1990, New York correspondent 1990–1995, business reporter 1995–1997, and sports correspondent 1997–2000.

Public relations
From the Financial Times, Harverson joined Manchester United as Director of Communications in October 2000.

He joined the Office of the Prince of Wales on 2 February 2004.

In 2013, Harverson left the Royal Household to enter the private sector and he joined Milltown Partners LLP as a managing partner.

Honours
Harverson was appointed Lieutenant of the Royal Victorian Order (LVO) in the 2013 New Year Honours.

References

British male journalists
1962 births
Living people
Lieutenants of the Royal Victorian Order
Financial Times people
British public relations people